Leifeng is a subdistrict of Wangcheng District in Changsha City, Hunan Province, China. It is named after Chinese hero Lei Feng, who was supposedly born there.

History
Leifeng was a portion of Wangyue and Bairuopu townships in 1949, Anqing township was formed in 1950. Huanghuatang commune was formed in 1968, it was renamed as Huanghuatang township in 1984. On March 16, 1993, Huanghuatang township was renamed Leifeng town.

Liaojiaping subdistrict
Liaojiaping was a subdistrict formed from a portion of Huangjin On August 28, 2012. It covered  with a population of 10,269 in 2012. There were three villages of Liaojiaping, Baima and Sanyi under its jurisdiction; its administrative centre was at Sanyi. it was also merged to Leifeng on November 19, 2015.

Subdivision
After merging with Liaojiaping on November 19, 2015, Leifeng contained eight villages and two residential communities. Leifeng community was formed by merging of Leifeng village and Runyuan residential community on March 23, 2016, the Leifeng subdistrict has two residential communities and seven villages under its jurisdiction.

Subdivision of pre-Leifeng before 2015
Leifeng had 15 villages and two residential communities in 2002, the villages and communities were merged into six villages and a residential community in 2003, the Heyeba village was changed to the Dongfanghong town of Yuelu district in 2004, Leifeng had five villages and a residential community under its jurisdiction from 2004 to 2014.
 Hehuatang residential community: formed by the former Hehuatang and Longhuitang residential communities in October 2003.
 Leifeng village: formed by the former Huanghuatang and Leifeng  villages  in October 2003.
 Qiaotoupu village: formed by the former Qiaotoupu, Matou and Shitang villages in October 2003.
 Pailouba village: formed by the former Pailouba, Tuizishan and Hexin villages.
 Pingshan village: formed by the former Pingshan, Ping'an and Shuangfeng villages in October 2003.
 Zhenrenqiao village: formed by the former Zhenrenqiao, Tongxin and Fengshu villages in October 2003.

Transportation
China National Highway 319 and the G0401 Changsha Ring Expressway (G0401) pass through the town and an interchange with the Changzhang Expressway (G5513) is nearby. The Changsha Railway Station is 15 km away, and Changsha Huanghua International Airport is 35 km away.

Attractions
Leifeng Subdistrict is the site of Lei Feng Memorial Hall. The hall was begun in 1966 and completed in November 1968. It includes 349 displays on the life and veneration of Red Chinese hero Lei Feng.

Former Residence of Lei Feng
Party History Museum of the CPC Hunan Provincial Committee

Locator maps
Map of Wangcheng, Changsha — Leifeng is at the bottom of the map

References

External links

Township-level divisions of Wangcheng
Wangcheng